Gillian Wilson is a British and American astronomer and cosmologist whose research uses infrared astronomy to study the evolution of galaxies, galaxy clusters and protoclusters, massive ancient galaxies, and the dynamics of star formation as galaxies age. She is a professor of physics and astronomy at the University of California, Riverside, where she is also senior associate vice chancellor for research & economic development.

Wilson completed her Ph.D. in 1996 at Durham University. She was named a Fellow of the American Physical Society (APS) in 2021, after a nomination from the APS Division of Astrophysics, "for pioneering techniques and significant contributions to clusters of galaxies, massive galaxies and cosmology, as well as for sustained leadership in research administration, broadening participation and outreach".

References

External links
Home page

Year of birth missing (living people)
Living people
American astronomers
American cosmologists
American women astronomers
British astronomers
British cosmologists
British women scientists
Alumni of Durham University
University of California, Riverside faculty
Fellows of the American Physical Society